Michelle Sima (1963–2015) was a Chinese actress from Hong Kong. Sima is credited with over 25 films.

Early life 
On March 15, 1963, Sima was born in Hong Kong.

Career 
In 1980, Sima became a beauty pageant contestant in Miss Hong Kong, but she was not placed. In 1983, Sima became an actress in Hong Kong films. Sima first appeared as Pak Wing-Sin (or Dior Bai Yongxian) in The Sensational Pair, a 1983 Drama film directed by Albert Lai Gin-Kwok. Sima was active in the 1980s and early 1990s as a supporting actress or sex symbol role in Cantonese Romantic Comedy, Drama, and Horror films. Sima's last film was The Mad Monk, a 1993 Fantasy film directed by Johnnie To Kei-Fung. Sima is credited with over 25 films. In 1996, Sima retired from the film industry.

Filmography

Films 
This is a partial list of films.
 1983 The Sensational Pair - Pak Wing-Sin (or Dior Bai Yongxian)
 1989 Doubles Causes Troubles - Inspector Xu
 1990 Demoness from Thousand Years (aka Chase From Beyond) - Policeman
 1993 The Mad Monk - Pregnant wife

Personal life 
In 1996, Sima married Togi Gouw, an Indonesian-Chinese businessman. They had two sons, Ian Gouw and Brian Gouw. Sima's son Ian Gouw became a child actor. In 2012, Sima was diagnosed with stomach cancer. On January 10, 2015, Sima died from stomach cancer in Hong Kong. Sima was 51 years old.

References

External links 
 Yin Szema at imdb.com
 Michelle Sima Yan at scmp.com

1963 births
2015 deaths
Hong Kong film actresses